The Zardari family (Sindhi: زرداري خاندان ; Urdu:زرداری خاندان) is a Pakistani political family which currently holds the chieftaincy of the Sindhi-Baloch Zardari tribe. It owns thousands of acres of land in the Sakrand Taluka, Shaheed Benazirabad District, Sindh, especially in the Fatohal Zardari and Balu Ja Quba villages. The family heads the Zardari tribe, which is a Sindhi-Baloch.

List of family members
 Sajwal Khan Zardari, father of Haji Hussain Zardari and grandfather of Hakim Ali Zardari
 Haji Hussain Zardari, father of Hakim Ali Zardari and son of Sajwal Khan Zardari
 Hakim Ali Zardari, father of Asif Ali Zardari and son of Haji Hussain Zardari
 Asif Ali Zardari, the patriarch of Zardari family, son of Hakim Ali Zardari and husband of Benazir Bhutto
 Bilawal Bhutto Zardari, son of Benazir Bhutto and Asif Ali Zardari
 Bakhtawar Bhutto Zardari, daughter of Benazir Bhutto and Asif Ali Zardari
 Aseefa Bhutto Zardari, daughter of Benazir Bhutto and Asif Ali Zardari
 Azra Pechuho, daughter of Hakim Ali Zardari
 Faryal Talpur, daughter of Hakim Ali Zardari
 Muhammad Pechuho, son of Azra Peechoho

See also
 Bhutto family
 Zardari tribe
 Zardari (disambiguation)

References

External links

 
Political families of Pakistan
Pakistan People's Party politicians
Baloch families
Baloch people
Baloch tribes
Sindhi families